Fly Hellas (formerly Viking Hellas Airlines) was a privately owned charter airline. Its main base was Athens International Airport.

History
In October 2009 Viking Hellas was created and awarded their air operators certificate by the Hellenic CAA.

On 1 February 2010 operations commenced with a single McDonnell Douglas MD-83 undertaking scheduled and charter flights throughout Europe. An order for two Airbus A320-200s was announced soon thereafter.

In October 2010, its parent Viking Airlines ceased operations, attempting to resume operations in March 2011. This did not happen. During this time, in February 2011 Viking Hellas announced that it would be re-branded as FlyHellas to distance itself from the Viking Airlines A.B group. The airline officially changed its name to Fly Hellas on 1 May 2011. The airline also announced that it would close its base at Gatwick Airport, however they would open a base at Manchester Airport.

On 2 November 2011, Fly Hellas announced that due to financial difficulties they were to stop all flights for November 2011, hoping to return in December. On 5 December, it was announced that Fly Hellas would not be restarting flights but would permanently cease all operations and enter into administration. All four aircraft were returned to their lessors.

Destinations

Fleet
The Fly Hellas fleet included the following aircraft as of November 2011:

References

External links

 Descriptif compagnie Viking Hellas

Defunct airlines of Greece
Airlines established in 2009
Airlines disestablished in 2011
Greek companies established in 2009